The 2006 Individual Speedway European Championship

Qualification
Qualifying Round A:
 Terenzano
Qualifying Round B:
 Blijham
Qualifying Round C:
 Lviv
Qualifying Round D:
 Daugavpils
Semi Final A:
 Ljubljana
Semi Final B:
 Örebro
Semi Final C:
 Wiener Neustadt

Final
October 1, 2006
 Miskolc

See also

2006
European I